The Men's 10 metre air rifle singles event took place at 6 October 2010 at the CRPF Campus. There were a qualification round held to determine the final participants.

Results

External links
Report

Shooting at the 2010 Commonwealth Games